William Cory may refer to:

 William Johnson Cory, poet
 William Wallace Cory, Canadian politician

See also
 William Corry (disambiguation)